Bryan Van Den Bogaert (born 14 December 1991) is a Belgian professional footballer who plays as a left back for Kazakh club Kyzylzhar.

Career
Van Den Bogaert spent his early career in Belgium with Cappellen, Heist and Antwerp. Before signing for Heist in September 2013 he had spent two weeks training in Russia. He moved from Heist to Antwerp in September 2014.

After being released by Antwerp in April 2015, he trialled with English club Bolton Wanderers. In August 2015 he trialled with another English club, Crawley Town, after a five-hour drive from his home in Belgium. He signed a short-term contract with the club later that month. After making 2 appearances for the club, he signed for non-league club Whitehawk later that month. He made his debut for Whitehawk in a 2–2 draw at Ebbsfleet United on 29 August. Although naturally a left-back, Van den Bogaert has played for Whitehawk as a centre-back. He moved to Ebbsfleet United in January 2016. He was confirmed as having left Ebbsfleet United in June 2016.

In October 2020, Van Den Bogaert signed a one-year contract with RWDM in the Belgian First Division B, after having playing for Westerlo for three seasons.

On 28 January 2022, Van Den Bogaert signed with KA in Iceland. He then signed for Kazakh club Kyzylzhar.

Personal life
In September 2013 he was living with his parents in Kalmthout.

References

1991 births
Living people
Belgian footballers
Association football fullbacks
Royal Cappellen F.C. players
K.S.K. Heist players
Royal Antwerp F.C. players
Crawley Town F.C. players
Whitehawk F.C. players
Ebbsfleet United F.C. players
K.V.C. Westerlo players
RWDM47 players
Knattspyrnufélag Akureyrar players
English Football League players
Challenger Pro League players
Belgian expatriate footballers
Belgian expatriate sportspeople in England
Expatriate footballers in England
Belgian expatriate sportspeople in Iceland
Expatriate footballers in Iceland
FC Kyzylzhar players
Belgian expatriate sportspeople in Kazakhstan
Expatriate footballers in Kazakhstan